Nate Morton (born December 30) is an American drummer. He is the drummer for the house band on NBC's TV show The Voice.

In 2005 and 2006 Morton appeared on the Mark Burnett's Rock Star: INXS and Rock Star: Supernova reality shows, as drummer for the House Band. During that time he has also appeared on two CDs, Rock Star: A Night at the Mayan Theatre, and Dark Horse, released by Ryan Star.

In 2004, Morton completed a national tour as drummer with the American Idol band. Before that, he was the drummer for platinum-selling, Grammy-nominated, singer-songwriter Vanessa Carlton. He spent two years as the drummer for Natalie Cole, toured with Chaka Khan, The Hippos, and Poe and performed with Madonna at the 2002 Grammy Awards. Morton is endorsed by Pearl Drums, hardware and pedals and as of 2015 percussion formally endorsed by RhythmTech, as well as Zildjian drumsticks and cymbals, Roland electronics and V-Drums and Remo drumheads. He's a graduate of the renowned Berklee College of Music, cites Animal from The Muppets as his primary influence and thanks his parents and his first drum instructor Grant Menfee for their early support of his musical aspirations. "The bottom line is I hit things with sticks for a living, and that's a pretty fun job."

Morton and the House Band toured the United States with Paul Stanley (from KISS) in October/November 2006 as well as Australia in April 2007.

In 2008 Morton performed on MTV's Rock The Cradle with Rock Star (TV series) House Band members Rafael Moreira and Paul Mirkovich. Outside of the studio he has also performed with Miley Cyrus and Rafael Morieira's band, Magnetico.

As for performing on the TV series "Rock Star", Morton states, "I am very, very, very blessed to get to do what I do," he said. "I'm playing with, like, the baddest guys in the world."  Those guys include guitarist Rafael Moreira, bassist Sasha Krivtsov, multi-instrumentalist Jim McGorman and keyboard player Paul Mirkovich, who is also the music director. He is now the drummer for the backing band for the new MTV reality show Rock The Cradle with his fellow Rock Star alum guitarist Rafael Moreira and keyboard/piano Paul Mirkovich. Nate is also the drummer for the house band on the Bonnie Hunt Show.

Playground Philosophy
In 2006, Morton released his solo album, Playground Philosophy.

 Best In Life (feat. Kandace Lindsey)
 Shelter
 Figure It Out
 Laughing
 Clever
 All Dessert Diet
 Playground Philosophy
 Tho'Ya Handzup!
 Stop Calling My Home
 Rain
 Talking To Myself
 Writer's Block

Morton has commented, on making the CD,
"There are countless elements in society that try to squeeze the youth out of you, or tell you that it's not okay to hold on to a little immaturity. It's so easy to lose yourself attempting to meet the expectations of others. Certainly there are practical matters that make it difficult to spend the entire day playing with Play-Doh and paste, but there are no reasons why you can't break it out on occasion. I doubt my dad realized the wheels he was setting in motion, but ultimately he began weaving the tapestry that was to become Playground Philosophy. The album's subject matter deals largely with the idea of following your path despite the nay-sayers. The exploration of Playground Philosophy was a learning experience that I will always treasure. Should you chose to add it to your CD collection, I hope you will enjoy listening to it as much as i enjoyed creating it."

Early influences
Morton has said, about starting drumming,
"I was four. I was banging away on anything I could get my hands on. My parents got the hint and bought me a set when I was five. I played to records when I was starting out. Then, just before high school I started taking lessons with Grant Menefee near Baltimore, Maryland. He really helped me understand the technical side of drumming."

References

External links
 Nate Morton Official Web site
 Nate Morton (MySpace) Web Site
 2015 Audio Interview with Nate Morton from the I'd Hit That Podcast
 Nate Morton on ROCKBANDLOUNGE.COM
 2007 Rocksquad Interview

American drummers
Berklee College of Music alumni
Living people
Year of birth missing (living people)